Patricio Loustau (born April 15, 1975) is an Argentine former football referee who officiated primarily in Primera División since 2009, as well as for FIFA as a FIFA international referee since 2011, until his retirement on the 2022 season finale. His father, Juan Carlos Loustau, is a former football referee, who officiated in the 1990 FIFA World Cup, held in Italy.

He was selected to referee 2014 FIFA World Cup qualifiers. On September 6, 2013, after officiating the 2–1 victory for Uruguay over Peru in a qualifier at the Estadio Nacional of Perú, he had to be escorted out of the stadium due to angry Peruvian fans, who were upset over controversial calls in the match. Peruvian press claimed he was following CONMEBOL instructions, especially from the newly appointed CONMEBOL President Eugenio Figueredo, who is a Uruguayan national.

Loustau was selected as one of the referees for Copa America Centenario where he officiated the Paraguay vs. Costa Rica Group A match in Orlando, Florida.

On January 30, 2021, he whistled the final of the Copa Libertadores, between Palmeiras and Santos.

References

1975 births
Living people
Argentine football referees
Copa América referees